HMCS St. Boniface was a reciprocating engine-powered  built for the Royal Canadian Navy during the Second World War. During the war, the vessel was used as a convoy escort in the Battle of the Atlantic. Following the war, the ship was sold for civilian use as a merchant vessel, last being registered in 1954.

Design and description
The ships' complement consisted of 85 officers and ratings.

The reciprocating ships had two vertical triple-expansion steam engines, each driving one shaft, using steam provided by two Admiralty three-drum boilers.

The Algerine class was armed with a QF  Mk V anti-aircraft gun and four twin-gun mounts for Oerlikon  cannon. The latter guns were in short supply when the first ships were being completed and they often got a proportion of single mounts. By 1944, single-barrel Bofors  mounts began replacing the twin 20 mm mounts on a one for one basis. All of the ships were fitted for four throwers and two rails for depth charges. Many Canadian ships omitted their sweeping gear in exchange for a 24-barrel Hedgehog spigot mortar and a stowage capacity for 90+ depth charges.

Construction and career
St. Boniface was laid down at Port Arthur Shipbuilding Co. Ltd. in Port Arthur, Ontario on 21 May 1942. The ship was launched on 5 November that same year and was commissioned into the Royal Canadian Navy at Port Arthur on 10 September 1943.

The minesweeper made her way up the St. Lawrence River to Halifax and performed workups in the Pictou, Nova Scotia region from November to December 1943. Following workups, the ship was assigned to the Western Escort Force for convoy escort duties in the Battle of the Atlantic. She was made Senior Officer Ship of the escort group W-5 upon joining. As Senior Officer Ship, the commander of the escort would be aboard her during convoy missions. She remained a part of this group until mid-April 1944, when she transferred as Senior Officer Ship of escort group W-4. St. Boniface continued in this role until December 1944 when she put into Halifax to undergo minor repairs. After working up in Bermuda, she returned to escort group W-4.

On 18 April 1945, St. Boniface collided with the merchant vessel  in the approaches to Halifax. The minesweeper made Halifax under her own power but had suffered significant damage. The repairs took three months, at which point, W-4 was disbanded in June. St. Boniface was placed in reserve at Halifax and remained there until being paid off on 25 June 1946. St. Boniface was then sold for mercantile use and was last registered as Bess Barry M. in 1954 under a Panamanian flag.

See also
 List of ships of the Canadian Navy

References

Bibliography

External links 
 Haze Gray and Underway
 ReadyAyeReady.com

Algerine-class minesweepers of the Royal Canadian Navy
Ships built in Ontario
1942 ships
World War II minesweepers of Canada
World War II escort ships of Canada